Muhammad Jaenal Ichwan (born 1 May 1977 in Banyuwangi) is an Indonesian footballer.  He currently plays for Persebaya Surabaya.

Club career

Petrokimia Putra 
He played continental level when Petrokimia Putra qualified to representative of Indonesia for ASEAN Club Championship. He scored three goals for his team in championship. With this club, he won Premier Division in 2002.

Persatuan Sepakbola Lamongan 
On 15 August 2010, it was reported that Persatuan Sepakbola Malang had agreed a deal with Persatuan Sepakbola Lamongan to sell Jaenal Ichwan subject to a medical.

Honours

Club
Petrokimia Putra
 Liga Indonesia Premier Division: 2002

Persija Jakarta
 Copa Indonesia runner-up: 2005

International
Indonesia
 AFF Championship runner-up: 2002

References

1977 births
Living people
People from Banyuwangi Regency
Indonesian footballers
Liga 1 (Indonesia) players
Persela Lamongan players
Indonesia international footballers
Persija Jakarta players
Association football forwards
Sportspeople from East Java